Biaora Assembly constituency is one of the 230 Vidhan Sabha (Legislative Assembly) constituencies of Madhya Pradesh state in central India.

It is part of Rajgarh District.

Members of the Legislative Assembly

See also
 Biaora

References

Assembly constituencies of Madhya Pradesh